Regional Committee in Protection of Revolution in Ukraine was a short lived revolutionary organization preceding the Kiev revolutionary committee of Bolsheviks. It declared itself the supreme authority in Ukraine after the October Revolution. The committee was created on the night November 7-8, 1917 at the closed door session of the Executive Committee of Central Council of Ukraine with representatives of revolutionary organizations of Ukraine. It was dissolved in couple of days and transferred its authority of the General Secretariat of Ukraine.

Composition
The committee consisted of the following representatives from:
 Central Council of Ukraine
 All-Ukrainian Soviet of soldiers deputies
 Ukrainian General Military Committee
 Chief Railway Committee
 National political parties
 Soviets of workers and soldiers deputies of Kiev, Kharkov, Odessa, Yekaterinoslav

List of members: Mykola Porsh (chairman), Mykhailo Tkachenko, Oleksandr Sevryuk, Mykola Kovalevsky, Andriy Nikovsky, Fedir Matushevsky, Yuriy Pyatakov, Mykyta Shapoval, Solomon Goldelman, S.Saradzhev, Anatoliy Pisotsky, Symon Petlyura, Mykola Shumytsky, Mykhailo Telezhynsky, Hryhoriy Kasyanenko, Isaak Kreisberg, Volodymyr Zatonsky, Moisei Rafes, Moisei Zilbelfarb.

Development

On November 9, 1917 in its announcement to residents of Ukraine the committee reported that it concentrate functions of central power in its hands and being responsible to the Central Council of Ukraine. The committee created a revolutionary headquarters for organization of military forces and presented a request to the commander of Kiev Military District Mikhail Kvetsinsky that all military units will be subordinated to the orders of the Ukrainian General Military Committee (UHVK), while orders of a commander and district headquarters were controlled by a commissariat of nine people that the committee created. The committee also requested to depose the representative of the Provisional Government .

The committee, however, was not able to control the situation. The administration of the Kiev Military District (KVO) refused to recognize the committee and after the fall of the Provisional Government of Russia considered itself the only legitimate power in the city. It rejected the committee's request and arrested its members of commissariat who were sent for negotiations. In order to reach a consensus with the headquarters of KVO, Symon Petlyura personally as the chairman of UHVK arrived for negotiations. The district administration refused any further negotiations with the committee that included bolsheviks.

Committee dissolved
After the executive committee of Central Council of Ukraine condemned the Petrograd uprising on November 8, 1917 adopting a resolution, next day Bolsheviks left the committee. The assembly created the Kiev city Bolshevik revolutionary committee in preparation to overthrow the power led by Leonid Pyatakov, brother of Yuri Pyatakov. On November 11, 1917 the members of the new Bolshevik Kiev revolutionary committee were arrested. 

In protest against further negotiations with the Kiev Military District, the members of the rest Ukrainian political parties left the regional committee as well. Due to such situation the committee was forced to dissolve and on November 10, 1917 transferred its authority to the General Secretariat of Ukraine.

Bibliography
 1917 in Kyiv: chronology of events. Kyiv, 1928
 Ukrainian Central Council: Documents and materials. Vol.1. Kyiv 1996
 Soldatenko, V.F. Ukraine in the revolution times: historical essay-chronicles in four volumes, 1917 (Україна у революційну добу. Рік 1917). "Svitohlyad". Kyiv, 2010.

External links
 Regional committee in protection of revolution in Ukraine at the website of Institute of history of Ukraine of the National Academy of Sciences of Ukraine.
 October Revolution. Regional Committee in Protection of Revolution of the Ukrainian Central Council, 1917

History of Ukraine (1795–1918)
History of Kyiv
Government of Ukraine
Russian Revolution in Ukraine
Organizations established in 1917
Organizations disestablished in 1917
1917 establishments in Ukraine
1917 disestablishments in Ukraine